A Capitol Death is  a historical novel by British writer Lindsey Davis, the seventh  in her Flavia Albia series. It was published in the UK by Hodder & Stoughton on 4 April 2019   .

The cover of the UK hardback 1st edition shows a sea shell, likely to be the dye-producing bolinus brandaris, on a purple, perhaps bloodstained, background.

The tale is set in November AD 89 on the Capitoline Hill, and includes a death by falling from the Tarpeian Rock, a stinking family of shell-fish boilers who produce the imperial purple dye, the preparations for Domitian's double triumph, family relationships, and augury, while Flavia and her husband are setting up their new household.

In an interview with her editor Oliver Johnson, Davis discussed her successful plan to base a series of books on the seven hills of Rome, starting with the Aventine Hill and reaching the Capitoline Hill with this latest book.

References

Novels set in ancient Rome
British historical novels
Flavia Albia novels
2019 British novels
21st-century British novels
Hodder & Stoughton books
Novels set in the 1st century
St. Martin's Press books